Jerry Ahtola (born March 25, 1986) is a Finnish professional ice hockey forward who currently plays for Ilves of the Liiga

Ahtola has previously played for HIFK, Tappara, Lukko and TPS.

References

External links

1986 births
Living people
Finnish ice hockey forwards
HIFK (ice hockey) players
Ilves players
KOOVEE players
Lukko players
Rovaniemen Kiekko players
Sportspeople from Turku
Tappara players
HC TPS players
TuTo players